This is a list of the tallest buildings and structures in Hungary.

Tallest buildings

Tallest structures

Trivia
The Magasház of Pécs is mentioned in the Guinness Book of Records as the tallest uninhabited structure in Central Europe.

The TV tower of Kékes is "only" 178 m tall, but its location on the top of Hungary's highest mountain makes its top 1201 m high above sea level.

Gallery

Non-Buildings Structures

Buildings

References

Sources
 World's Tallest Skyscrapers by country
 "Hungarian tallnesses" (Hungarian only)
 Hungarian Wikipedia
 Air-traffic obstacle list of Hungary

Hungary
Skyscrapers in Hungary
Tallest buildings
Hungary